United Nations Security Council Resolution 413, adopted unanimously on July 20, 1977, after examining the application of the Socialist Republic of Vietnam for membership in the United Nations, the Council recommended to the General Assembly that Vietnam be admitted.

See also
 List of United Nations member states
 List of United Nations Security Council Resolutions 401 to 500 (1976–1982)

References
Text of the Resolution at undocs.org

External links
 

 0413
 0413
 0413
1977 in Vietnam
July 1977 events